The Chesley Award for Best Color Work – Unpublished is given by the Association of Science Fiction and Fantasy Artists (ASFA) to recognize unpublished achievements in original color science fiction & fantasy artwork eligible in the year previous to the award.

Winners and nominees

References

External links
 The Chesley Award section of the ASFA website

Color Work - Unpublished
Science fiction awards